Cupertino High School, colloquially referred to as "Tino", "CHS", is a four-year comprehensive public high school located near the Rancho Rinconada and Fairgrove neighborhoods of Cupertino, California, USA. The school serves mostly suburban residential and areas in eastern Cupertino, southern Santa Clara, and west San Jose.

Cupertino High School is part of the Fremont Union High School District along with Monta Vista High School, Lynbrook High School, Fremont High School, and Homestead High School. Two main feeder schools, Lawson Middle School and Hyde Middle School, are the closest middle schools. The school serves the areas of Sunnyvale, Santa Clara, San Jose and Cupertino.

Cupertino High is accredited by the Western Association of Schools and Colleges.

History
Cupertino High School opened on September 15, 1958, with a student population of 694 ninth and tenth graders and 28 staff members, with George Fernandez as principal. At its inception, Cupertino High originally contained four classroom buildings, a school office, and a cafeteria. Other buildings weren't fully complete at the time of its opening, leaving vacant lots at the back of the school as well as its sides.

In 1971, Robert L. Gomez and a group of family started the Tournament of Bands: an annual event where high school marching bands come together and compete.

In 2009, in an effort to go green, the school built solar panels in the front staff parking lot.

In 2010, most of the athletic fields were gradually demolished one by one.

On January 3, 2014, the renovated school building opened to the public, connected to the original gym and theater. It is made up of new bathrooms, a library, a new computer lab, and a new cafeteria. The main office was replaced along with the guidance and counseling offices.

In 2017, Cupertino High opened two new buildings (6000-7000) that include new classrooms, lawns, and a mini-quad within the building's center. The building consists of 22 classrooms, a Career and Technical Education lab and six modern science classrooms.

In 2020, the school building closed due to the COVID-19 pandemic and transitioned into remote learning. 2020 spring semester grades were changed to the Pass / No Pass system.

The school reopened for the 2021 - 2022 school year. As of March 2022, the mask mandate has been removed in response to the California law.

As of 2022, Kami Tomberlain is the current principal of Cupertino High School. The enrollment is currently 2112 students.

Campus

The classroom wings are tied together by one main hallway. Each section contains classrooms for a single department. In the main classroom wing, classrooms are numbered from 101 - 420 while 500 - 900 surrounds the main classroom wing.

 The 100s wing is mainly composed of English and ELD classrooms. 
 The 200s wing is mainly for history and elective classrooms. To the east of the wing lies the main office, the library, and the assistant principals' offices, as well a few other classrooms. 
 The 300s wing is mainly used as a foreign language and history section. It also houses a computer lab. 
 The 400s and 900s wings are mostly math classrooms with a few foreign language rooms. 
 The 500s classroom is to the west of the 100s classroom wing and contains most AP and Honors science classes. 
 Rooms 701-703 are used for the music department. Rooms 721-723 contain the Associated Student Body classroom and the Computer Science department.
 Rooms 6000 - 7000 house science, electives, and foreign language classes.

There is a football field at the southern tip of the campus (rubber track and American football field). The gymnasium, swimming pool, baseball field, soccer/field hockey/softball field and tennis courts reside between the football field and the classroom in the southern part of the school.

The Cupertino High School quad centers most student activities including clubs day, spirit week, and fairs. Club day is an event where Cupertino High School clubs presents their club and fundraises by selling food. Spirit weeks are weeks where students dress up in different styles, often pertaining to a theme, and participate in school events.

There is a main cafeteria next to the quad which includes a kitchen and seating available in two floors. There is also a career center are located on the other side of the quad. Connecting the two buildings is a glass bridge which mainly consists of a library, but also including a computer lab, conference rooms, and a staff counseling office.

The main gym hosts rallies and large speaker events. Rallies are spirit events the school hosts multiple times a year. Notable rallies include the Homecoming Rally, Hall of Fame Rally, and the Senior Send off Rally.

Cupertino High School has a theater for its performing arts programs (Drama, Band, Orchestra). The theater was named after Robert L. Gomez for his contributions to Cupertino High School's music education.

Statistics

Demographics 
2021–2022

 2112 students

Standardized testing

GPA 
Cupertino High School's grades does not include + or - and does not include weighted GPA. Cupertino High School also doesn't post class ranks.

There is a high proportion of students getting high GPAs. Around 10% of Cupertino High School has a 4.0 UW GPA with the vast majority of students with a 3.5 GPA.

AP exams 
In 2022, 927 students took 2363 exams. Out of these students, 84% of students scored a 3 and higher.

Other statistics 
87% of students has at least one parent with a bachelor's degree or higher.

Academics 
Cupertino High School has a strong academic program and is ranked the top 50 high school in California. The high school is more STEM focused due to its location in Silicon Valley.

Cupertino High School has above average standardized test scores in the SAT and ACT. In 2022, there were 38 National Merit Semifinalist and 62 National Commended.

Mathematics 
Cupertino High School offers many courses in Math ranging from Algebra 1 to AP Calculus BC. There are many pathways students can take depending on the student's level of math, but usually the two most common pathways is regular and honors. Students typically start in Algebra 1, Geometry, Geometry Enriched, Algebra 2, or Algebra 2/Trigonometry in ninth grade. There are honors courses equivalent for each level of math (Geometry vs. Geometry Enriched; Algebra 2 vs. Algebra 2/Trig; Pre Calculus vs. Pre Calculus Honors; AP Calculus AB vs. AP Calculus BC). Students who has completed AP Calculus BC can take Multivariable Calculus or Linear Algebra through the dual enrollment program in De Anza College or West Valley College. There are other courses available like AP Statistics.

Science 
Science is another significant department in Cupertino High School. There are AP courses offered in all three of the major sciences (Bio, Chem, and Physics). In addition, there is also AP Environment Science. Most science courses are taught in the old science building (500s) or the new science building (6000s - 7000s) with a higher concentration of AP classes taught in the old science building. AP Physics C is offered by putting both AP Physics C: Mechanics and AP Physics C: Electricity & Magnetism into one year, making it one of the hardest course on campus.

World languages 
There are four languages offered in Cupertino High School: Chinese, Japanese, Spanish, and French. Every languages has classes for five levels (level 4 is honors and level 5 is AP).

Other programs 
Cupertino High School include special programs like AVID, Terra Nova, and Special Education.

AVID is a high school program designed to prepare students for success in four year universities. The goal of the program is to teach organization, leadership, and academic skills.

Terra Nova is another high school program designed for high potential students who need additional support during the school day.

Student government and events 
Cupertino High School Associate Student Body is the official student government of Cupertino High School. There are four executive ASB positions: President, Vice President, Treasurer, and Secretary. These position exist as the top of the ASB. Inside each class council, there are also equivalent positions. In addition to the executive positions, there are other positions that fall under ASB commissions. These include campus link, clubs, IDC, Athletics, Publicity, and Spirit.

ASB plan school wide events such as rallies, homecomings, Junior Prom and Senior Prom. Class council supports ASB activities and hosts fundraiser to raise funds for their own class.

Student Senate 
Student Senate serves as the legislative council of Cupertino and votes in important ASB policies and clubs. The goal of the council is to improve student life on campus.

IDC 
The Intra-District Council's goal is to improve relationships within schools of the FUHSD district. The IDC council represents Cupertino High School Students and hosts IDC exchanges, a FUHSD event where students go to other FUHSD schools for a day to meet people to experience life there.

Powderpuff 
Powderpuff was an annual event where girls play American football and guys cheerlead.

Extracurriculars 
Cupertino High School has many extracurricular activities and programs for its students.

Academic Olympiad 
Cupertino High School hosts multiple competitions including USNCO, USAPHO, USABO and the AMC competitions (AMC 10, AMC 12, and AIME). Many students qualify in the upper divisions of these Olympiads.

In 2021, there were 23 AIME qualifiers. In addition, a Cupertino High School Student competed for the IMO (the most prestige high school math competition internationally) and received the sliver metal.

USACO 
Cupertino High School hosts a competitive programming club designed to support students in the USACO competition.

Robotics team 
The Cupertino High School Robotics team was established in 2007 by seven member. Currently, robotics is a significant organization in Cupertino High School with over 200 members and 8 mentors. There are three programs within: FIRST Lego League Challenge, FIRST Tech Challenge, and FIRST Robotics Competition.

The FRC Team is called The Goldstrikers (2473). There are 4 FTC Teams as of 2022 (4950, 6038, 7128, 7610).

Clubs 
There are around 60 clubs in Cupertino High School. Clubs revolve around different interest and ranges in sizes from a dozen to hundreds of students. There are many Honor Societies, Service Clubs, and STEM clubs.

FBLA 
FBLA is the largest club on campus with around 200+ students. The club focuses on competition in 70 different fields and  projects that teaches FBLA principles. The club houses connection to Lawson Middle School and Hyde Middle School for its middle school program.

Tinovation 
Tinovation is the largest Computer Science Club in Cupertino High with 100+ members.

The club has four fields (Android, IOS, Web, and Python) and focuses on educating students on Computer Science. Each year, the club partakes in a project every year club wide.

The founder of Tinovation dropped out of Stanford and started a unicorn.

Due to Cupertino High's proximately with Apple and Silicon valley, there is a high number of students interested in computer science, other clubs has been formed to address individual interests which are listed below.

 Tino Competitive Club
 Tino Game Development Club
 CHS Women In Tech,
 CHS Girls Who Code

Service clubs 
Service clubs in Cupertino High encourages students to volunteer in the local community. Some clubs offer the President Volunteer Service Award for completing a required number of hours.

STEM clubs 
Stem clubs make up a large portion of all clubs on campus. Clubs usually focus on STEM concepts and partake in events.

The Tino Math Club helps students in the AMC competitions.

Language honor societies 
There is an honor society for each of the four languages offered in Cupertino High School. Students in the Honor Society usually host cultural events, volunteer, take national language exams, and encourage learning about foreign culture.

Performing arts

Marching band 
Cupertino High School has a marching band named Cupertino High School Proud Pioneer Marching Band. The band is currently led by Gilbert Iruegas.

Cupertino High hosts the Tournament of Bands (TOB): an annual event where high school bands come together and compete. The event happens on the second Saturday of October annually. In 2021, Cupertino High hosted The 50th annual Tournament of Bands on Saturday, October 9, 2021.

Other music programs include Concert Band, Symphonic Band, and Wind Ensemble.

Winter Percussion 
Winter Percussion was established in 2016 for students to continue professional percussion training. The Winter Percussion students compete in local NCPA and WGI competitions. In 2022, Cupertino High School Winter Percussion will compete in the Winter Guard International (WGI) Championships in Dayton, OH.

Cupertino Actor Theatre 
Cupertino High School boasts an award-winning drama program, Cupertino Actors Theatre, that produces plays and musicals, provides educational theatre workshops for English classes, and many opportunities for performance and design for students considering a career in the performing arts.

Publications

Newspaper and magazine 
The official Cupertino High School newspaper is The Prospector. The prospector publishes eight print issues yearly and online.

There are also other unofficial student publications such as the Cupertino Science Magazine and the Philosophy Magazine.

Yearbook 
Cupertino High School's yearbook is The Nugget. In 2013, The Nugget has won back-to-back consecutive Gold Crown Awards at the CSPCA in New York City and has won the Pacemaker Award at the Spring NSPA Conference in San Francisco.

Athletics 
Cupertino High School is a member of the California Interscholastic Federation and participates in the Santa Clara Valley Athletic League. The school offers sports in three seasons (fall, winter, and spring) with most sports separated by boys and girls. Sports offered are listed below. 
Badminton
Baseball
Basketball
Cheerleading
Color guard
Cross country
Dance
Field hockey
Football
Golf
Gymnastics
Marching band
Soccer
Softball
Swimming
Tennis
Track and field
Volleyball
Water polo
Wrestling
Winter guard
Winter percussion
Cupertino High School's main rival school is considered to be Monta Vista High School through the Helmet Game, a game started in 1985 with Cupertino High and Monta Vista High.

Dance 
Cupertino High School has multiple dance teams from different student organizations. The main dance team is the Golden Spurs. There is also a K-pop Dance Team from KASA (Korean American Student Association). The K-pop dance group has a YouTube channel with 4.5 million views. Both teams regularly perform at rallies and sports events.

Curriculum

APs and honors 
Currently, Cupertino High School offers 18 AP Courses and seven different honor courses.

Graduation requirements 
Cupertino High School runs on a semester system. 220 credits are the minimum necessary to graduate Cupertino High School. Five credits are awarded for each semester class completed. Sports are considered to be five credits.

Achievements

Honors and accolades 
In 1996, Cupertino high School was awarded the National Blue Ribbon Award for public and private K–12 schools that are either academically superior in their states or that demonstrate dramatic gains in student achievement.

Cupertino High was named a California Distinguished School by the California Department of Education in the years 1990, 1994, 2007, and 2021 based on its efforts to support impoverished students and student body success.

As of 2022, it is ranked 292nd in the U.S. News Best High School rankings, 39th in California, and 21st for STEM high schools nationwide.

Student achievements 
Cupertino High's 2010 graduating senior class was awarded $100,000 by Dell for a SuperProm.  For four years the class decided that, rather than fundraising for junior and senior prom, they would raise funds for the Nthimbiri Secondary School in Kenya, and pledged to collect $100,000, calling the project Kenya Dream. In early 2010, the senior class came across Dell's SuperProm contest and submitted a video to possibly win the contest and also increase awareness of Kenya Dream. The seniors competed against 200+ schools across the country and won with 32,145 votes.

Notable alumni

Sports 
 John Hencken – Olympic swimmer, medalling at the 1972 and 1976 Summer Olympics
 Dan Kutler – Olympic swimmer
 Kurt Rambis – NBA basketball player and coach
 Judas Prada – college basketball coach
 Eva Lee - badminton competitor at the 2008 Summer Olympics
 Christopher Sullivan - professional soccer player, member of the U.S. national team

Entertainment, news media, and music 
 Doug Ferrari - comedian
 Nina Garbiras – actress
 Bryan "Brain" Mantia – musician, drums
 Azadeh Moaveni – journalist and author
 Renée Montagne – host, Morning Edition, NPR
 Peter Shin (1989) – film director
 Mohammad Gorjestani (2002) - film director
 Maline Hazle (1965) - journalist - San Jose Mercury News

Politics 
 John Doolittle – Congressman from California's 4th congressional district
 Fred Keeley – Assemblyman, California's 27th State Assembly district

Academia 
 Lawrence H. Keeley — archaeologist, researcher, and professor

Notable staff and faculty
Stu Pederson, MLB player, former frosh/soph head baseball coach at Cupertino

References

External links

School website

Cupertino, California
Educational institutions established in 1958
Fremont Union High School District
High schools in Santa Clara County, California
Public high schools in California
1958 establishments in California